Agamemnon was a  74-gun ship of the line of the French Navy. She served during the later days of the First French Empire, notably taking part in the action of 5 November 1813. During the Bourbon Restoration, she was razéed into a 58-gun frigate and renamed Amphitrite.

Career 
Built in French-occupied Genoa, Agamemnon was commissioned in 1812 and appointed to the Toulon squadron. She took part in the action of 5 November 1813 under Jean-Marie Letellier, and suffered the brunt of the French losses during the engagement, with nine wounded and damage to her masts.

In June 1822, she transferred to Brest and the next year, she was razéed into a 58-gun frigate. She was recommissioned on 17 April 1824 as Amphitrite. In 1827, she cruised the Mediterranean under Commander Troude, taking part in the blockage of Algiers in October.

Agamemnon was decommissioned in July 1829, but reactivated for the Invasion of Algiers. She was again decommissioned in November 1830, and hulked in Toulon in 1836.

Citations

References

  (1671-1870)

Ships of the line of the French Navy
Téméraire-class ships of the line
1812 ships